Laevapex is a genus of small, freshwater, air-breathing limpets, aquatic pulmonate gastropod molluscs in the family Planorbidae, the ram's horn snails and their allies.

Geographic distribution 
The genus has a New World distribution. It is widespread throughout the eastern United States, occurring in lakes and slow-flowing rivers.

Anatomy 
These animals have a pallial lung, as do all pulmonate snails, but they also have a false gill or "pseudobranch" which can serve perfectly well as a gill when they are unable to reach the surface for air.

Members of this genus are characterised by their smooth apex.

Species 
Species within the genus Laevapex include:

 Laevapex diaphanus Haldeman, 1841 
 Laevapex fuscus C. B. Adams, 1841 
 Laevapex peninsulae Pilsbry, 1903 
 Laevapex vazi Santos, 1989

Walther (2008) considers North American Laevapex monotypic, collectively synonymising L. diaphanus, L. peninsulae and unidentified Laevapex sp. with L. fuscus, the type species.

References

External links 

Planorbidae
Gastropod genera